Christos Socrates Mantzoros is a Greek American physician-scientist, practicing internist-endocrinologist, teacher and researcher. He is a professor of medicine at Harvard Medical School and an adjunct professor at Boston University School of Medicine. He currently serves as the chief of endocrinology, diabetes and metabolism at the VA Boston Healthcare System, where he created de novo a leading academic division true to its tripartite mission and as the founding director of human nutrition at Beth Israel Deaconess Medical Center (BIDMC), Harvard Medical School. Finally, he holds the editor-in-chief position of the journal Metabolism: Clinical and Experimental.

In the past, Mantzoros has also served as a professor of environmental health at the Harvard School of Public Health, associate fellowship program director at BIDMC and later as endocrinology, diabetes and metabolism founding fellowship program director at the Boston VA Healthcare System.

A practicing internist, endocrinologist and dedicated educator, he is considered a pioneer and worldwide expert in obesity and metabolism. He has given more than 600 lectures nationally and internationally on these critical topics. His research has resulted in more than 1.000 publications in total, i.e. 700 publications under his name in Medline in addition to more than 200 publications under the collaborative Look Ahead Research Group and more than 290 chapters and reviews or editorials. His work has received more than 150,000 citations, with an h-index of 148 and an i10-index of 576 (Google Scholar).

Personal 
Christos S. Mantzoros was born in Nafplio, Greece, and graduated with MD and received a DSc from the University of Athens Medical School. He completed a residency in internal medicine at Wayne State University and a fellowship in endocrinology, metabolism and diabetes as well as clinical nutrition at the Longwood Training Program (Beth Israel Deaconess Medical Center, Brigham and Women’s Hospital, and Joslin Diabetes Center) of Harvard Medical School. He also received master's degrees in clinical epidemiology from the Harvard School of Public Health and clinical investigation from Harvard Medical School. He is board certified in internal medicine and in endocrinology, metabolism and diabetes, as well as in clinical nutrition. He went rapidly through the academic hierarchy steps from instructor to full professor of internal medicine at Harvard University within twelve years.

Research 
His work spans the entire spectrum from animal physiology and molecular biology, through observational, epidemiology studies, to physiology and pharmacokinetic interventional proof-of-concept clinical trials on new therapeutic agents important in the treatment of obesity, diabetes and other metabolic diseases in humans. Dr. Christos Mantzoros is known for his groundbreaking work on leptin, adiponectin and the proglucagon family of molecules as well as the relationship between insulin-like growth factor (IGFs) and cancer. Recent major contributions of his research group include the elucidation of the physiological role and potential diagnostic and therapeutic utility of several gastrointestinal hormones, myokines and adipokines (i.e. leptin and adiponectin) in human physiology and pathophysiology. Leptin has subsequently been approved by the Food and Drugs Administration for lipodystrophy and severe insulin resistance accompanied by hyperglycemia and hyperlipidemia. His work has resulted in patents for diagnostic and therapeutic applications and has directly contributed to major pharmaceutical companies’ development of new pharmaceuticals. Currently, he and his team are utilizing various interventions (physiological, pharmacological and dietary) and tools (physiological, hormonal, neurocognitive and neuroimaging, functional MRI) to investigate the role of the human brain and peripheral organs in regulating energy homeostasis, obesity and metabolism, and associated comorbidities e.g. diabetes, NASH, cardiovascular diseases and malignancies.

In 2018, Dr. Mantzoros gave a Harvard Medical School Mini Med lecture to teach medical concepts to a lay audience. The lecture was attended by close to 100,000 people from all over the world through live-streaming.

Leptin and Adiponectin 
In the area of leptin, Mantzoros pioneered physiology and pharmacokinetic studies, conducted clinical trials in humans, and discovered its therapeutic potential for humans. He was the first to investigate the normal physiology of leptin in humans, including circadian rhythms and the role of leptin in fasting, neuroendocrine regulation in humans and in relation to body weight. His team has published the only three studies on leptin pharmacokinetics determining leptin doses to be used in humans. Indeed, his research broadened the understanding of the neuroendocrine function of leptin on body weight, energy homeostasis, gender differentiation, immunology and the interaction with other hormones, such as thyroid-stimulating hormone and sex steroids. Observing that extreme leanness, hypothalamic amenorrhea (HA) and lipodystrophy were conditions of hypoleptinemia, he piloted clinical trials to test the efficacy of leptin to treat these conditions, showing that leptin replacement in patients with HA and lipodystrophy resulted in complete normalization of hormone axes and bone density in HA as well as improvements in insulin resistance and metabolic regulation in lipodystrophy. Additionally, he observed that functional changes in how the brain views food occur in subjects with hypoleptinemia and that these can be corrected with leptin replacement. Dr. Mantzoros and his team observed that short-term metreleptin treatment enhanced activity in areas detecting the salience and rewarding value of food during fasting. In contrast long-term treatment decreased attention to and the rewarding value of food after feeding. Furthermore, hypothalamic activity is modulated by metreleptin treatment and leptin reduces functional connectivity of the hypothalamus to key feeding-related areas in these hypoleptinemic subjects. These findings expanded the role of leptin from that of a hormone regulating energy expenditure to a hormone important in systemic neuroendocrine regulation. The Mantzoros team subsequently focused on physiology studies to explore and elucidate determinants of adiponectin levels in the circulation as well as the physiological role of adiponectin in humans.

Proglucagon derived peptides 
More recently, Dr. Mantzoros’ interest and studies have been directed towards the physiology and clinical significance of GIP and the proglucagon-derived peptides, including endogenous GLP-1, glucagon-like peptide-2, glucagon, oxyntomodulin, glicentin and major proglucagon fragment, which play a significant role in metabolic homeostasis and weight regulation. Among other physiology and interventional studies, Dr. Mantzoros published a randomized control trial which showed that administration of the GLP-1 analog liraglutide to overweight/obese individuals leads to downregulation of other proglucagon-derived molecules, suggesting that normalization of the decreasing levels of several of these molecules may provide additional metabolic and weight loss benefits in the future.

Neuroimaging studies 
Most recently, Dr. Mantzoros has been working on the interplay of hormones and environmental factors to influence the function of brain centers important in energy homeostasis and metabolism and how these may be altered with pharmaceuticals to treat obesity. Focusing on the human brain, he studies the control of eating behaviors as they are affected in obesity in the human cortex. Most significantly, he determined the role of GLP-1 in the human brain. When Dr. Mantzoros and his team examined the GLP-1 analog liraglutide in diabetic adults and found that liraglutide was decreasing activation in the brain's cortex, the area that increases control and makes individuals more attentive to what they are eating. This suggests that individuals on liraglutide find highly desirable foods less appealing and that the medication might prove an effective weight loss therapy for people who tend to eat foods as a reward, such as when they are stressed. Even though short-term treatment with GLP-1RAs decreases activation in the insula, putamen, caudate and orbitofrontal cortex (areas of the reward system), which may lead to lower energy intake and may thus contribute to weight loss, the impact of GLP-1RAs on brain activity disappears during long-term treatment, which may also explain the eventual weight-loss plateau observed with these medications. Furthermore, Dr. Mantzoros and colleagues examined the serotonin 2c receptor agonist lorcaserin in obese adults and discovered that lorcaserin was decreasing activation in the attention-related parietal and visual cortices in response to highly palatable food cues at 1 week in the fasting state and in the parietal cortex in response to any food cues at 4 weeks in the fed state. Decreases in emotion and salience-related limbic activity, including the insula and amygdala, were attenuated at 4 weeks. In a secondary analysis, they observed that decreases in caloric intake, weight, and BMI correlated with activations in amygdala, parietal and visual cortices at baseline, suggesting that lorcaserin would be of particular benefit to emotional eaters. Recently, Dr. Mantzoros’ team performed the first neuroimaging study investigating the association of blood concentration of oxyntomodulin, glicentin and GIP with brain activity in response to food cues. Findings showed that fasting blood levels of GIP were inversely associated with the activation of attention-related areas (visual cortices of the occipital lobe, parietal lobe) and of oxyntomodulin and glicentin with reward-related areas (insula, putamen, caudate for both, and additionally orbitofrontal cortex for glicentin) and the hypothalamus when viewing highly desirable as compared to less desirable food images. These studies have important implications for obesity and future therapeutics.

Non-alcoholic fatty liver disease and steatohepatitis 
In addition to his work on obesity and diabetes, recognizing the rising burden of NAFLD which currently affects approximately 30% of Americans, Dr. Mantzoros has been focusing on unveiling the pathophysiology of the disease as well as developing diagnostic, prognostic and therapeutic tools. Regarding pathophysiology, the Mantzoros group has linked NAFLD with not only central obesity and the hormones leptin and adiponectin but also with low skeletal mass, skeletal tissue hormones including activins, follistatins and irisin as well as with the quality of the diet and the protective role of Mediterrenenan diet. The Mantzoros team using the techniques of omics and supervised learning has developed novel models utilizing a top down approach (instead of the usual candidate molecule approach) i.e.metabolites, lipids, hormones and glycans that can diagnose with high accuracy the presence of NASH, NAFLD or healthy status as well as a model that can diagnose liver fibrosis using lipids. In addition to demonstrating the significant role of diet, especially that of Mediterranean diet, and dietary habits in the prevention and management of NAFLD, he has been further focusing on the emerging role of antidiabetic and other medications important in metabolism suggested to be used on the background of medical nutrition and lifestyle modification therapy for the treatment of advanced NASH. For all these reasons Dr. Mantzoros has proposed that a new and more accurate name for this disease i.e. DAFLD/DASH (Dysmetabolism Associated Fatty Liver Disease / Steatohepatitis) would be much more appropriate. Most recently, Dr. Mantzoros, representing the Endrocrine Society, has participated in the working group that published the "call to action" paper inviting primary care physicians and subspecialists to prepare for the epidemic of this prevalent condition and to contribute to screening, diagnosing and treating it in their clinics. This working group subsequently published the 2021 guidelines on diagnosis and treatment. Recently, Dr. Mantzoros has proposed a new name and a new classification to replace NAFLD, as an umbrella diagnosis under a pathophysiology-based subclassification of Fatty liver disease (FLD).

Epidemiology of cancer 
Observing that the incidence of certain cancers increases with the rate of obesity (e.g. cancers which have been linked with obesity such as endometrial, esophageal, breast, etc.), Dr. Mantzoros hypothesized that insulin-like growth factor 1 (IGF-1) which is also found at higher levels in obesity and a growth factor might be related to the development of cancer. Indeed, he first confirmed in a case-control study that IGF-1 was linked with prostate cancer. Later, he confirmed a similar link between IGF-1 and other types of cancers, including thyroid, breast, and others both in case control and prospective epidemiology studies. This work opened the way for efforts to develop molecules blocking IGF-1 signaling as possible treatments for cancer, currently being tested.
 
Additionally, observing the links between insulin resistance, inflammation, and sex steroids with central obesity and obesity-related cancers, Dr. Mantzoros expanded this research to the molecule adiponectin, hypothesizing that abnormalities in this molecule, caused by abnormal fat deposition in the abdomen, were upstream of all other hormonal and inflammatory abnormalities above. First performing physiology studies in rodents and later in human case-control and prospective cohort studies, his team demonstrated the link between adiponectin and several types of cancer, including breast, colorectal, thyroid, prostate, and others. This work opened the way for efforts to develop molecules blocking IGF-1 signaling as possible treatments for cancer, currently being tested.

The Mantzoros group also demonstrated a direct effect of adiponectin and adiponectin receptors on endometrial and other cancers in humans and started mapping the molecular pathways downstream of adiponectin in malignancies. This suggests that adiponectin regulation, which is upstream of insulin resistance and IGFs, may be at the root of obesity-related cancers. Due in large part to this research, adiponectin receptor agonists and/or medications that increase circulating levels of adiponectin are currently being tested as a treatment for cancers related to insulin resistance and central obesity.

Mediterranean Diet 
Dr. Mantzoros also demonstrated that following a Mediterranean Diet, which is high in whole-grain cereals and low-fat dairy products and low consumption of refined cereals, leads to improved levels of adipokines like adiponectin, which decreases insulin resistance, and inflammatory factors like c-reactive protein, and thus leads in the long-term to lower incidence of death from cardiovascular disease and stroke.

Metabolism: Clinical and Experimental 
Metabolism: Clinical and Experimental is a biomedical journal published by Elsevier related to all aspects of metabolism. Metabolism: Clinical and Experimental publishes studies in humans, animal and cellular models. The journal, one with a long history in the field of metabolism, was in decline for several years until 2010. Dr. Mantzoros assumed the position of editor-in-chief for the journal Metabolism: Clinical and Experimental in 2010. Since then, the journal has experienced a higher than 20% growth annually in all metrics and its impact factor more than quadrupled under his leadership (current IF: 13.93). The continuous and significant increase of the impact factor and cite score (4 year impact factor) has placed Metabolism: Clinical and Experimental in the top 3% of endocrinology, diabetes and metabolism. Its cited half-life, or the duration an average paper continues receiving citations, was 9.4 in 2018, placing the journal in the top 5% of its category. The current (2022) journal cite score is 16.5.

Translation of science into tangible clinical benefits 
Mantzoros consults for several companies as the head of the Mantzoros Consulting, LLC. In 2005, he co-founded Intekrin, Inc. which was later acquired by and merged with Coherus, Inc. These companies are developing a number of biosimilars at several stages of clinical development in humans (one approaching FDA approval) in addition to small molecules for diseases related to insulin resistance (e.g. Diabetes, NAFLD). CHRS-131, just successfully completed Phase II trials in humans for multiple sclerosis. More recently, Mantzoros has co-founded or has contributed developing additional biotech companies.

Teaching and mentoring 
Mantzoros currently serves as the chief of endocrinology, diabetes and metabolism at the VA Boston Healthcare System and the director of the Human Nutrition Unit at Beth Israel Deaconess Medical Center. He teaches at Harvard Medical School and Boston University School of Medicine. He has closely mentored more than 175 scientists, many of whom are now full professors, two are now CEOs, two are chief medical officers and one is chief scientific officer of pharmaceutical / biotechnology companies, several are vice presidents of biotechnology companies and several others are currently assistant and associate professors, executive directors at pharmaceutical companies or clinicians.

Mantzoros, an active member of the Eastern Orthodox Catholic Church, has served in many roles, including teaching pro bono biomedical ethics at the Hellenic College and Holy Cross School of Theology and serving as a member of the Archdiocesan Advisory Council on Bioethics. He has also served as a board member on the Hellenic College Holy Cross (HCHC) board of trustees.

Awards 
Mantzoros has received several prestigious awards for his lifetime achievements: 
2021 Korean Society of Nutrition Award co-administered with the American Society for Nutrition
2020 Gerald Reaven Distinguished Leader in Insulin Resistance Award by the World Congress on Insulin Resistance, Diabetes and Cardiovascular Disease
2020 American Society for Nutrition E.V. McCollum Award 
2018 American Society for Nutrition Robert H. Herman Research Award
2018 European Society of Endocrinology highest distinction, i.e. the Geoffrey Harris Award 
2018 Endocrine Society’s Outstanding Clinical Investigator Award
2017 Obesity Society TOPS Award

Other (selected) Awards include:
Frontiers in Science Award by the American Association of Clinical Endocrinology 
Novartis Award in Diabetes and Metabolic Diseases by the American Diabetes Association
Lilly Award by the North American Association for the Study of Obesity (the Obesity Society) 
Mead Johnson Award by the American Society for Nutrition
HypoCCS award in Paris, France
Wilhelm Friedrich Bessel Award by the Humboldt Foundation of Germany
Outstanding Investigator Award by the American Federation of Medical Research
Hygeia award by the New England Hellenic Medical and Dental Association
Berson Award Lecture by the American Physiological Society (FASEB) 
BIDMC and Harvard Medical School award for Excellence in Mentoring

Honorary titles
Four honorary PhDs from medical schools worldwide
Three honorary professorships from medical schools worldwide
Six visiting professorships from medical schools worldwide 
The Clinical Nutrition Laboratories of the International Hellenic University have been named the “Christos Mantzoros Clinical Nutrition Laboratories”
Mantzoros has been elected a member of ASCI 
Mantzoros has been elected a Fellow of the American College of Physicians and the American Association of Clinical Endocrinology

References

Year of birth missing (living people)
Living people
American endocrinologists
American physicians
American people of Greek descent
Harvard Medical School alumni
Harvard Medical School faculty
Medical journal editors
Mediterranean diet advocates